Lukas Fienhage (born 12 September 1999) is an international speedway rider from Germany.

Speedway career 
Fienhage won the gold medal at the World Longtrack Championship in the 2020 Individual Long Track World Championship.

References 

1999 births
German speedway riders
Living people